Mama, or Kantana, is a Bantu language spoken in Nigeria.

The number of speakers is unclear.  A figure of 20,000 was published in 1973.  In 2011, "Kantana" (presumably the same language) was said to have 2,000–3,000 speakers, mostly over 25 years old.  A partial count of the ethnic community in the 2006 census was 6,000–9,000.

References

Jarawan languages
Languages of Nigeria